Saros cycle series 145 for solar eclipses occurs at the Moon's ascending node, repeating every 18 years, 11 days, containing 77 events. It is currently a young cycle producing total eclipses less than 3 minutes in length. The series started with a partial solar eclipse on January 4, 1639, and reached a first annular eclipse on June 6, 1891. It was a hybrid event on June 17, 1909, and total eclipses from June 29, 1927, through September 9, 2648. The series ends at member 77 as a partial eclipse on April 17, 3009. The longest duration eclipse in the cycle will be member 50 at 7 minutes and 12 seconds in length on June 25, 2522, after which the durations of eclipses will decrease until the end of the cycle. In its central phase it will produce mainly total eclipses (41 of 43 central eclipses). All eclipses in this series occur at the Moon's ascending node.

This solar saros is linked to Lunar Saros 138.

Umbral eclipses
Umbral eclipses (annular, total and hybrid) can be further classified as either: 1) Central (two limits), 2) Central (one limit) or 3) Non-Central (one limit). The statistical distribution of these classes in Saros series 145 appears in the following table.

Events

References 
 http://eclipse.gsfc.nasa.gov/SEsaros/SEsaros145.html

External links
Saros cycle 145 – Information and visualization

Solar saros series